The Paperback Library began releasing novels based on the TV series Dark Shadows in December 1966. There were thirty-three novels released through to 1972, all of them written by William Edward Daniel Ross under his pen name Marilyn Ross.

All of the novels, with the exception of House of Dark Shadows were part of one shared continuity separate from the history supplied in the original television series. House of Dark Shadows was an adaptation of the MGM film, House of Dark Shadows and as such, represented a separate continuity.

Most of the books follow a formula of a heroine arriving at, or already living at, Collinwood and falling in love with Barnabas Collins, not realizing that he's a vampire. The heroine subsequently finds herself endangered by some natural or supernatural threat requiring Barnabas to rescue her. By the story's conclusion, the heroine guesses or suspects that Barnabas is a vampire but still wants him anyway, prompting Barnabas to depart rather than involve her with his cursed existence.

An unresolved plot point that featured in both the television series and the novel series was the mystery of Victoria Winters origins. Ross had planned to reveal Victoria as Barnabas' long-lost daughter, conceived in the 1940s during a time when Barnabas found himself temporarily free of the vampire curse. Her biological mother, who died young, was the best friend of Elizabeth Collins Stoddard. However, when actress Alexandra Moltke left the television series in 1968, the editors of the book series instructed Ross to immediately remove the character without solving the mystery.

Many of the 1st printings of the novels featured covers with enframed production stills from the television show. Invariably, the photographs represented on the covers had little if anything to do with the actual stories contained within.

References
Notes

Dark Shadows